Liu Mingli (born 1956) is a vice admiral (zhong jiang) of the People's Liberation Army Navy (PLAN) of China.

Biography
Liu was born in Liaoning in 1956. He assumed various posts in the People's Liberation Army Navy (PLAN), such as political commissar of PLA Navy Equipment Research Institute, director of Political Department of the East Sea Fleet, and political commissar of Aviation Units of the South Sea Fleet. In December 2014 he was promoted to become political commissar of South Sea Fleet, and he doubles as deputy political commissar of the Southern Theater Command. On July 29, 2016, he was awarded the rank of vice admiral (zhong jiang) by the Central Military Commission.

References

1956 births
Generals from Liaoning
Living people
People's Liberation Army Navy admirals
Chinese Communist Party politicians from Liaoning